Jelani Marwan McCoy (born December 6, 1977) is an American former professional basketball player. A 6'10" power forward/center, he played in the NBA from 1998-2007 for the Seattle SuperSonics, Los Angeles Lakers, Toronto Raptors, Cleveland Cavaliers, Atlanta Hawks, and Denver Nuggets.  He attended college at UCLA and high school at St. Augustine High School in San Diego, California.

College career
In 1998, was UCLA's career leader in blocked shots.

McCoy was suspended in late September 1997 for violating "unspecified" team rules but reinstated three months later.

Professional career
McCoy compiled NBA career averages of 4.7 points and 3.6 rebounds. He was part of the Los Angeles Lakers team that won the 2002 NBA Finals, but he was injured most of the season and was not on their playoff roster.

McCoy played for the Denver Nuggets in the NBA Summer League in Las Vegas.  In five games, McCoy averaged 9 points and 9 rebounds in 21 minutes per game. After averaging 8 points, 6.5 rebounds, 4 blocks and 3.5 assists in two games with the D-League's Los Angeles D-Fenders, McCoy was signed during the 2007-08 season in late November 2007 by the Nuggets to fill their depleted frontcourt after players Kenyon Martin, Nenê and Steven Hunter were unavailable due to injuries. Mike Wilks was waived to make room on the roster. On December 19, 2007 he was waived by the Denver Nuggets. McCoy started the 2008-09 preseason with the Los Angeles Clippers, but was waived before the start of the season.

On January 19, 2006 McCoy signed with Italian club Viola Reggio Calabria. In February 2007, he signed with Spanish club Menorca Bàsquet.

References

External links

1977 births
Living people
African-American basketball players
American expatriate basketball people in Canada
American expatriate basketball people in China
American expatriate basketball people in Italy
American expatriate basketball people in Mexico
American expatriate basketball people in Spain
American expatriate basketball people in Ukraine
American expatriate basketball people in Venezuela
American men's basketball players
Atlanta Hawks players
Basketball players from San Diego
BC Azovmash players
Cáceres Ciudad del Baloncesto players
Centers (basketball)
Cleveland Cavaliers players
Denver Nuggets players
Fujian Sturgeons players
Jiangsu Dragons players
Liga ACB players
Los Angeles D-Fenders players
Los Angeles Lakers players
Marinos B.B.C. players
McDonald's High School All-Americans
Menorca Bàsquet players
Power forwards (basketball)
Seattle SuperSonics draft picks
Seattle SuperSonics players
Basketball players from Oakland, California
Toronto Raptors players
UCLA Bruins men's basketball players
Viola Reggio Calabria players
Zhejiang Lions players
21st-century African-American sportspeople
20th-century African-American sportspeople